The Pullman Paris Montparnasse Hotel is skyscraper hotel located near the Gare Montparnasse in the 14th arrondissement of Paris, France. With 957 rooms, it is the third-largest hotel in Paris after the Le Méridien Étoile and the Hyatt Regency Paris Étoile.

History
The hotel was designed by architect Pierre Dufau and opened in 1974 as the Paris-Sheraton Hotel. In 1982 it was sold to the Swiss-based Nova-Park Hotels chain and renamed Montparnasse Park Hotel. The Nova-Park chain went bankrupt soon after, and the hotel became Le Meridien Montparnasse on 1 July 1986. In 2010, the owners, Unibail-Rodamco, switched management to Accor Hotels and the hotel became the Pullman Paris Montparnasse Hotel on 11 January 2011. The hotel closed on 31 August 2017 for renovations, which included the addition of a roof terrace. It was set reopen in May 2020, but the reopening was postponed to 27 December 2021, due to the COVID-19 pandemic.

The building also hosts an important bowling and pool hall.

See also 
 Skyscraper
 List of tallest structures in Paris

References

External links 
 Pullman Paris Montparnasse Hotel official website
 Pullman Paris Montparnasse Hotel (Emporis)

Paris Montparnasse Hotel
Hotel buildings completed in 1974
Hotels established in 1974
Skyscraper hotels in France
Skyscrapers in Paris
Buildings and structures in the 14th arrondissement of Paris
Sheraton hotels